This article records new taxa of fossil archosaurs of every kind that are scheduled described during the year 2014, as well as other significant discoveries and events related to paleontology of archosaurs that are scheduled to occur in the year 2014.

Pseudosuchians

Research 
 A study of anatomy and phylogenetic relationships of Gracilisuchus stipanicicorum, Turfanosuchus dabanensis and Yonghesuchus sangbiensis is published by Butler et al. (2014).
 A study on the impact of sea level variations and sea surface temperatures on the evolution of marine crocodylomorphs is published by Martin et al. (2014).
 A study of jaw mechanism and dental function in heterodont crocodyliforms is published by Ősi (2014).
 A study on the types of serration in the teeth of members of the genus Machimosaurus is published by Young et al. (2014).
 The atoposaurid crocodyliform genus Alligatorellus is revised by Tennant and Mannion (2014).

New taxa

Non-avian dinosaurs

Research 
 A study on the patterns of body size evolution in dinosaurs is published by Benson et al. (2014).
 A study of size changes and rates of anatomical innovation in the theropod lineage ancestral to birds is published by Lee et al. (2014).
 A study of evolution of body size and forelimb length in birds and nov-avian coelurosaurian theropods is published by Puttick, Thomas and Benton (2014).
 A phylogenetic analysis of bird and non-avian coelurosaurian theropod relationships and a study of rates of morphological evolution and changes in morphological disparity across the dinosaur-bird transition is published by Brusatte et al. (2014).
 A description of abelisaurid teeth from the Late Jurassic Lourinhã Formation of Portugal and a phylogenetic analysis of theropod relationships based on dental characters is published by Hendrickx and Mateus (2014).
 A study of theropod diversity in the Cretaceous (Aptian-Albian) of Tunisia is published by Fanti et al. (2014).
 A juvenile specimen of Megaraptor namunhuaiquii is described by Porfiri et al. (2014).
 A study of European fossil record of Ornithomimosauria is published by Allain et al. (2014).
 A study on the morphological variability and function of manual claws in theropod dinosaurs, especially in therizinosaurs, is published by Lautenschlager (2014).
 A study of flight ability in some non-avian paravian theropods is published by Sorkin (2014).
 "Saurornitholestes" robustus, initially thought to be a dromaeosaurid, is reinterpreted as a troodontid by Evans et al. (2014).
 A well-preserved specimen of Microraptor zhaoianus is described by Pei et al. (2014).
 A study of anatomy and phylogenetic relationships of Antetonitrus ingenipes is published by McPhee et al. (2014).
 A study on the differences in skull anatomy of Diplodocus and Camarasaurus, and on their implications for inferring possible niche partitioning between Late Jurassic sauropod taxa known from the Morrison Formation, is published by Button, Rayfield & Barrett (2014).
 Fragmentary partial skeleton of a small sauropod belonging to the genus Haplocanthosaurus collected from the Rocky Mountains of central Colorado is described by Foster & Wedel (2014).
 The purported size of the holotype vertebra of Amphicoelias fragillimus is reevaluated by Woodruff and Foster (2014).
 A study of phylogenetic relationships of Lourinhasaurus alenquerensis is published by Mocho, Royo-Torres and Ortega (2014).
 A study of anatomy and phylogenetic relationships of Aragosaurus ischiaticus is published by Royo-Torres et al. (2014).
 A study of titanosaur osteoderms from the Upper Cretaceous Lo Hueco site in Cuenca, Spain is published by Vidal, Ortega and Sanz (2014).
 A study of species richness of South American titanosaur assemblages during the Late Cretaceous is published by Vieira et al. (2014).
 A study of the effect of intervertebral cartilage on neck posture of sauropod dinosaurs is published by Taylor (2014).
 A study of the dentition of Manidens condorensis is published by Becerra et al. (2014).
 A study of the postcranial anatomy of Heterodontosaurus tucki is published by Galton (2014).
 A study of the impact of osteoderm placement on the centre of mass of stegosaurs is published by Mallison (2014).
 A study of Early Cretaceous Spanish iguanodont ornithopod diversity and a description of new remains referrable to Delapparentia is published by Gasca, Canudo and Moreno-Azanza (2014).
 A specimen of Edmontosaurus regalis with remains of a soft-tissue cranial crest is described by Bell et al. (2014).
 A juvenile specimen of Edmontosaurus annectens is described by Prieto-Márquez (2014).
 An assemblage of Psittacosaurus juveniles associated with a larger specimen from the Lujiatun beds of the Yixian Formation in Liaoning, China is described by Hedrick et al. (2014).
 An aggregation of four juveniles of Protoceratops andrewsi from the Tugrikin Shire locality of the Djadokhta Formation in Central Gobi region, Mongolia and two associated subadults of the same species from the same locality are described by Hone et al. (2014).
 A study of ontogenetic changes in the craniofacial skeleton of Centrosaurus apertus is published by Frederickson and Tumarkin-Deratzian (2014).
 A new specimen attributable to Arrhinoceratops brachyops is described by Mallon et al. (2014).
 A study on the evolution of species belonging to the genus Triceratops, as indicated by their morphological variation and stratigraphic data from the Hell Creek Formation (Montana, United States), is published by Scannella et al. (2014).
 A new specimen of Spinosaurus is described by Ibrahim et al., with a controversial reconstruction of Spinosaurus as a quadrupedal semi-aquatic genus.
 Two new specimens of the previous enigma Deinocheirus are described and analysed by Lee et al. (2014).
A tiny theropod was found in the South Korea. (2014)

New taxa

Birds

Research 
 A study on the antiquity of birds is published by Lee et al. (2014).
 A new specimen of Archaeopteryx is described by Foth, Tischlinger and Rauhut (2014).
 Zhongornis haoae, initially thought to be a bird, is argued to be a non-avian maniraptoran by O'Connor and Sullivan (2014).
 A study of ecological disparity in Early Cretaceous birds is published by Mitchell and Makovicky (2014).
 A subadult specimen of Zhouornis hani is described by Zhang et al. (2014).
 New specimen of Hongshanornis longicresta, providing new information on the anatomy, trophic ecology and aerodynamics of this species is described from the Lower Cretaceous Yixian Formation (China) by Chiappe et al. (2014).
 A study of the species status of the moa from the genus Euryapteryx is published by Huynen and Lambert (2014).
 A study of growth in the moa from the genus Euryapteryx is published by Huynen et al. (2014).
 A study of tbx5 gene of the moa from the genus Dinornis is published by Huynen et al. (2014).
 New samples of Miocene ratite eggs are described from Namibia by Pickford (2014), who names new ootaxa Tsondabornis psammoides, Tsondabornis minor and Namornis elimensis.
 Fossil remains of a relative of the hoatzin, possibly a species belonging to the genus Namibiavis, from the middle Miocene of Kenya, are described by Mayr (2014).
 A specimen of Pumiliornis tessellatus with preserved stomach contents including pollen grains is described by Mayr and Wilde (2014).
 A Late Pleistocene specimen of griffon vulture (Gyps fulvus) with exceptionally well preserved fossilized soft tissues is described from the Alban Hills volcanic region, Italy by Iurino et al. (2014).

New taxa

Pterosaurs

Research 
 A study of pneumaticity of pterosaur wing bones is published by Martin and Palmer (2014).
 A complete and fully articulated juvenile specimen of Scaphognathus crassirostris is described by Bennett (2014).
 Partial 3D egg of Pterodaustro guinazui is described by Grellet-Tinner et al. (2014).
 Cearadactylus atrox is redescribed by Vila Nova et al. (2014).
 The taxonomy and distribution of the family Azhdarchidae is reviewed by Averianov (2014).
 A reevaluation of the fossil material attributed to Bakonydraco galaczi, indicating that the fossils actually represent at least two pterosaur taxa, is published by Prondvai, Bodor and Ősi (2014).
 A study of medullary bone-like tissue in the mandibular symphyses of Bakonydraco galaczi is published by Prondvai and Stein (2014).
 New postcranial remains belonging to thalassodromine pterosaurs from the Romualdo Formation in the Araripe Basin of Brazil are described by Aires et al. (2014).
 The morphology and evolution of the pelvis in pterosaurs is reviewed by Hyder et al. (2014), who also find significant differences that correlate well with several pterosaur clades.
 Bantim et al. (2014) analyze the skull variation and the shape of the sagittal premaxillary crests in anhanguerid pterosaurs using bidimensional geometric morphometrics.
 Costa et al. (2014) perform the myological reconstruction of the pelvic girdle and hindlimb of the pterosaur species Anhanguera piscator using three-dimensional virtual animation.
 Based on a digital three-dimensional osteological model of the species Anhanguera piscator, Costa et al. (2014) demonstrate that these types pterosaurs were quadrupedal animals.

New taxa

References 

2014 in paleontology